North End was an American boogie and club music-influenced garage house music group, consisted of Arthur Baker, Russell Presto and Tony Carbone.

North End debuted in 1979 with an uptempo disco track titled "Kind of Life (Kind of Love)" which was released by West End Records. Two years later, "Happy Days" was released on Emergency Records and peaked at number 9 on the Billboard Club Play Singles chart. Madonna's "Holiday" was loosely based on "Happy Days".

Although the band didn't technically exist in 1982, all their members continued to arrange and produce Michelle Wallace's material, including "Jazzy Rhythm" and "It's Right", both written by Baker, Presto and Carbone.

Discography

Singles

References

External links
 

American disco musicians
American boogie musicians
American garage house musicians
American dance music groups
Electronic music groups from New York (state)
Musical groups from New York City
Musical groups established in 1979
Musical groups disestablished in 1982